The Union County Courthouse is an historic redbrick courthouse building located in  Lake Butler, Florida. Designed by John Pearson of Gainesville in the Classical Revival style, it was built in 1936 by the Works Project Administration to serve Union County, which had been carved out of Bradford County in 1921. It is located on the site of a former courthouse that served the county of New River, Bradford's original name. In 1967 additions to the courthouse were designed by Harry E. Burns, Jr., and were built by Vinson J. Forrester, Jr.

In 1989, the Union County Courthouse was listed in A Guide to Florida's Historic Architecture, published by the University of Florida Press.

References

External links

 Florida's Historic Courthouses

Buildings and structures in Union County, Florida
County courthouses in Florida